The Hamilton Public Library (HPL) is the public library system of Hamilton, Ontario.

Services
HPL services include the Local History and Archives department (formerly called Special Collections), which houses an extensive collection of local history resources and government documents from the City of Hamilton, and the Learning Centre, which provides access to language materials for new Canadians. In recent years, the HPL’s collection of online resources has expanded rapidly, and now features more than 30 databases covering a great variety of topic areas.
Information and reference services
Access to full text databases
Community information
Internet access
Reader's advisory services
Programs for children, youth and adults
Delivery to homebound individuals
Interlibrary loan
Free downloadable ebooks and eaudiobooks
Multi-purpose rooms including the Hamilton Room at Central Library
Free musical concerts and dance performances
Six art galleries across the systems that exhibit local artists, artisans, archival displays and organizations

History
Public libraries have operated in Hamilton since the 1830s, although the first branches were privately operated and tended to be ephemeral in nature.

Hamilton and Gore Mechanics' Institute was one of a series of Mechanic's Institutes that were set up around the world after becoming popular in Britain. The Mechanic's Institutes libraries eventually became public libraries when the establishment of free libraries occurred.

Hamilton city council voted to publicly fund the construction and operation of a library in 1889.  This building opened in February 1890. Hamilton was the first city in Canada to erect a new building for the express purpose of housing a library.
A HPL branch opened on Hamilton’s Barton Street in 1908. Andrew Carnegie funded a new main library, which opened in 1913.  This was in turn replaced by a new, six-storey central library in 1980. Today, only one half of the building houses public collections.
Once restricted to the city of Hamilton, the HPL service area was expanded when the outlying townships were amalgamated into the City in 2001.  The now-amalgamated City of Dundas had had its own library in operation since 1822. The outlying rural towns had previously been served by the Wentworth Libraries system. In 2001, the Wentworth and Dundas libraries amalgamated with the HPL into a single system with 22 branches, 34 bookmobile stops, a virtual online branch and a Visiting Library Service for the homebound.

List of branches

See also
Freda Farrell Waldon
List of Carnegie libraries in Canada

References

External links

Culture of Hamilton, Ontario
Public libraries in Ontario
Carnegie libraries in Canada
Buildings and structures in Hamilton, Ontario
Education in Hamilton, Ontario
1890 establishments in Ontario
Libraries established in 1890